Yermak Angarsk is an ice hockey team in Angarsk, Russia. They play in the VHL, the second level of Russian ice hockey. The club was formerly affiliated with Metallurg Novokuznetsk of the KHL.

History
The club was founded as Trud Angarsk in 1959. They changed their name to Yermak Angarsk in 1964. 

By the end of the 90s the club had serious financial hardships and de facto ceased to exist and was revived only in 2005.

External links
 Official site
 Yermak Angarsk on Pribalt.info

Ice hockey teams in Russia
Ice hockey clubs established in 1958